Theodor Coccius (8 March 1824 – 24 October 1897) was a German pianist and pedagogue.

Coccius was born in Knauthain near Leipzig in 1824.  He was a pupil of Sigismond Thalberg.

He taught at the Leipzig Conservatory from 1864 for the rest of his life, alongside Ignaz Moscheles and Carl Reinecke.  His notable pupils included Oskar Merikanto, Aleksander Michałowski (1867–69), and Algernon Ashton.

He was the elder brother of the ophthalmologist Ernst Adolf Coccius (1825-1890).

He died in Leipzig in 1897, aged 73.

References

1824 births
1897 deaths
German classical pianists
Male classical pianists
German music educators
Piano pedagogues
Academic staff of the University of Music and Theatre Leipzig
Musicians from Leipzig
19th-century classical pianists
19th-century German musicians
19th-century male musicians
19th-century musicians